Morgan Craft (born May 11, 1993, in Muncy Valley, Pennsylvania), is an American competitive shooter. A member of the U.S. national shooting team in the women's skeet, she competed at the 2015 World Shotgun Championships in Lonato, Italy. She scored higher than teammate Caitlin Connor for the gold medal and a spot to her first Olympic Games in a shoot-off with a score of 15–13.

Craft is currently ranked number one in the women's Olympic skeet.

References

External links
Team USA Profile

1993 births
Living people
American female sport shooters
People from Muncy Valley, Pennsylvania
Sportspeople from Pennsylvania
Olympic shooters of the United States
Shooters at the 2016 Summer Olympics
21st-century American women
20th-century American women